A warning triangle is, together with warning lights, used in order to secure a traffic accident site. The legal rules in the individual states partly order a warning triangle to be brought in the vehicle (in Germany according to § 53a StVZO).

The warning triangle consists of three reflective beams, similar to a cat's eye, and a stable foot.

Except from this form, which is prescribed in road traffic, there are also collapsible signals or triangles, used by emergency services, but also for short road closures by other firms with workers in the road, perhaps gasworks or power plants. Collapsible signals also have further inscriptions, as the example photo shows. As they are collapsible, they need smaller space in vehicles than fixed boards.

Legal

Germany
According to § 15 StVO, a stranded vehicle must be secured with a warning triangle at a sufficient distance, whereby the law orders a minimum distance of 100 metres in the case of fast traffic, such as motorways. This applies not only to the driver of broken-down vehicles, but also the rescue service that stops and offers help. If the vehicle is removed from the breakdown site, the warning triangle must be collected; it is not allowed to leave it standing. In a few cases, a warning triangle must not be placed, if the circumstances do not allow it to be placed safely or practicable (e.g. due to rescuing severely injured people, which takes precedence).

United Kingdom
When present, a warning triangle must be placed at least 45 metres ahead of the accident site. Placement of triangles on motorways is, on the other hand, strongly dissuaded.

Russian Federation 
Paragraph 7.2 of the traffic regulations: When the vehicle is stopped and the alarm is turned on, as well as in case of its malfunction or absence, the emergency stop sign must be immediately displayed: in
case of a traffic accident;
when forced to stop in places where it is prohibited, and where, taking into account the visibility conditions, the vehicle cannot be noticed by other drivers in a timely manner.
This sign is installed at a distance that provides timely warning of danger to other drivers in a specific situation. However, this distance must be at least 15 m from the vehicle in populated areas and 30 m outside populated areas.

Paragraph 7.3 of the traffic regulations: In the absence or malfunction of an alarm system on a towed mechanical vehicle, an emergency stop sign must be fixed on its rear part.

Further reading 

 Allen, Merrill J., Stanley D. Miller, and James L. Short. "The effect of flares and triangular distress signals on highway traffic." Optometry and Vision Science 50.4 (1973): 305–315.
 Federal Motor Carrier Safety Regulations; Technical Amendments, 59 Fed. Reg. 49,585, 49,588 (September 29, 1994) (summarizes research about warning triangles)
United Nations Regulation No. 27. Uniform provisions concerning the approval of advance-warning triangles

References 

Vehicle law
Safety equipment
Traffic signs
Road safety